Shlomo Polachek (1877 – July 9, 1928) known as "the Meitscheter Illui" was born in Sinichinitz, near Meitchet, Grodna. He was an important Talmudic scholar and one of the earliest roshei yeshiva in America.

Biography
He entered the Volozhin yeshiva when he was only twelve years old, and remained there until its close in the winter of 1892. He then went to learn with his mentor, Rabbi Chaim Soloveitchik, in Brisk for the next four years. Rabbi  Elchonon Wasserman attested that he personally heard from Rabbi Chaim Soloveitchik, regarding Polachek in 1896, “Aza meshunediger illui vi der Meitsheter hob ich in leben nit gezen — I’ve never met a genius like the Meitscheter in my entire life.”

Polachek went on to become the rosh yeshiva in yeshivos in Lida and Białystok. At the invitation of Rabbi Dr. Dov Revel, Polachek arrived in America in 1922 to become a rosh yeshiva at the Rabbi Isaac Elchanan Theological Seminary (RIETS) the rabbinical school of Yeshiva University and its Yeshiva College, America's first yeshiva. He taught at RIETS for six years until his sudden passing in 1928.

Views
Polachek held some broad-minded views relative to some of his contemporaries. For example, Jeffrey S. Gurock writes in Judaism's Encounter with American Sports (Indiana University Press):

Following the sudden passing of Polachek in 1928, more than 15,000 people at gathered at his funeral outside the Yeshiva on the Lower East Side. Among those who eulogized him were Rabbi Boruch Ber Lebowitz. 

Rabbi Shimon Shkop was persuaded to replace him for a short period of time.

Family 
His children were notable in their own right, including daughter Rebbetzin Libby Mowshowitz (married to Rabbi Dr. Israel Mowshowitz), a son who received a PhD, and another son who became a doctor .

Prominent Students 
Some of Polachek's prominent students included:

 Rabbi Menachem Perr
 Rabbi Nosson Meir Wachtfogel
 Rabbi Chaim Pinchas Scheinberg
 Rabbi Isaac Tendler
 Rabbi Zalman Levine
 Rabbi Mordechai Stern
 Rabbi Nisan Waxman

Observance of his Yahrtzeit 
Each year on the 21st of Tammuz, there is a pilgrimage to his grave at the Mount Judah Cemetery in Ridgewood, Queens.

See also
Brisk yeshivas and methods
Yitzchak Elchanan Spektor (Rabbi Isaac Elchanan Spector, for whom RIETS is named)

References

W. Helmreich. The World of the Yeshiva: An Intimate Portrait of Orthodox Judaism. Yale University Press, 1986 (Revised Edition, 2000).
M. Sherman. Orthodox Judaism in America: A Biographical Dictionary and Sourcebook. Greenwood Press, 1996.
http://www.jewishgen.org/yizkor/Molchadz/mol085.html

1877 births
1928 deaths
Haredi rabbis in Europe
Rosh yeshivas
Yeshiva University rosh yeshivas
Lithuanian Haredi rabbis